Love Never Dies is a 1921 American silent drama film directed by King Vidor. Prints of the film survive in several film archives.

Plot
As described in a film magazine, John Trott (Hughes) overcomes the bad influence of a wretched home, becomes successful as a contracting engineer, and marries the beautiful Tilly Whaley (Bellamy). They settle down to a happy existence in their own cottage. Then a specter of his past appears, a drunken mother, and during his absence his wife is rushed home by her sanctimonious father Ezekiel Whaley (Brownlee) and is granted a divorce. John, accompanied by his foster sister, goes to a distant city. En route, the train is wrecked and he reports himself and the child killed. His wife marries a former sweetheart. Years later, John returns to the town and old love is renewed. The jealous husband attempts to kill John but is whipped in the encounter. The husband then decides to kill himself and is successful, despite John's valiant attempt to stop him. The couple are then reunited in their "cottage of delight."

Cast
 Lloyd Hughes as John Trott
 Madge Bellamy as Tilly Whaley
 Joseph Bennett as Joel Eperson
 Lillian Leighton as Mrs. Cavanaugh
 Fred Gamble as Sam Cavanaugh (credited as Fred Gambold)
 Julia Brown as Dora Boyles
 Frank Brownlee as Ezekiel Whaley
 Winifred Greenwood as Jane Holder
 Claire McDowell as Liz Trott
 Maxine Elliott Hicks as Dora Boyles as a Teenager (uncredited)

Production

Vidor’s spectacular cattle stampede in his previous picture The Sky Pilot (1921) was admired by critics.  Hoping to capitalize on that success, Vidor designed and built an elaborate model replica of a train and trestle and used it to stage a dramatic derailment. Impressed by this special effect demonstration, Thomas H. Ince agreed to finance the completion of Love Never Dies.

Footnotes

References
Baxter, John. 1976. King Vidor. Simon & Schuster, Inc. Monarch Film Studies. LOC Card Number 75-23544.
Durgnat, Raymond and Simmon, Scott. 1988. King Vidor, American. University of California Press, Berkeley.

External links

1921 films
1921 drama films
Silent American drama films
American silent feature films
American black-and-white films
Films directed by King Vidor
1920s American films